Ommabad or Amabad may refer to:
 Ommabad, Ardabil
 Ommabad, Zanjan